Fabien Vehlmann (born 30 January 1972) is a French comics writer best known for Green Manor and Seuls. Yvan Delporte dubbed him "The René Goscinny of the third millennium".

Biography

Fabien Vehlmann, born in 1972 in Mont-de-Marsan, grew up in the Landes and the Savoie. He studied in Nantes. He started writing comics in 1996, but only got to work for Spirou magazine the next year, where he provided very short stories for the weekly summary of the magazine. Soon, some stories of a few pages followed, with artwork by a number of different artists, including Eric Maltaite and René Follet.  His first recurring series was Green Manor with Denis Bodart. With Bruno Gazzotti he created Seuls.

In January 2009, it was announced in Spirou magazine #3694 that Jean-David Morvan and José-Luis Munuera would be succeeded as the creative team behind the series Spirou et Fantasio by Yoann and Vehlmann, who had together created the first volume of Une aventure de Spirou et Fantasio par.... Their first album in the regular series is announced for October 2009.

Bibliography

Awards
 2002: Iris award at the Prix Saint-Michel for Le Marquis d'Anaon
 2002: nominated for the Angoulême International Comics Festival Award for Best Scenario for Green Manor
 2002: nominated for the Angoulême International Comics Festival Award for First Comic Book for Samedi et Dimanche
 2005: nominated for the Angoulême International Comics Festival Award for Best Scenario for Le Marquis d'Anaon
 2006: nominated for Best comic (French language) at the Prix Saint-Michel for Seuls
 2007: Prix des libraires BD, awarded by Canal BD, for Les cinq conteurs de Bagdad
 2008: nominated for Best Youth Comic at the Prix Saint-Michel for Seuls 3

Notes

External links
Biography at Dupuis
Biographie at Evene.fr

1972 births
Living people
People from Mont-de-Marsan
French comics writers
French male writers